East Dailey is a census-designated place (CDP) in Randolph County, West Virginia, United States. As of the 2010 census, its population was 557. It is located within the Monongahela National Forest adjacent to the Tygart Valley River. East Dailey and its Old Timer's Camp are host to the Elkhenge Music Festival.

References

External links 
Elkhenge Music Festival
The Tygart Valley Homestead information and historic photos

Census-designated places in Randolph County, West Virginia
Census-designated places in West Virginia